Chey may refer to:

People

Given name
 Chey Chettha I (1575–1595), Cambodian king
 Chey Chettha II, Cambodian king
 Chey Chettha III (1639–1673), Cambodian king
 Chey Chettha IV (1656–1725), Cambodian king
 Chey Chettha V (1709–1755), Cambodian king
 Chey Dunkley (born 1992), English football player

Surname
 Chey Tae-won Tae-won (born 1960), South Korea billionaire businessman
 Timothy A. Chey, American film producer, writer and director

Places
 Chey, Deux-Sèvres, Nouvelle-Aquitaine, France
 Chey, Kampong Svay, Cambodia
 Chey Chouk Commune, Cambodia
 Chey Saen District, Cambodia

Other
 CHEY-FM, Canadian radio station